The Miss Florida competition is the pageant that selects the representative for the state of Florida in the Miss America pageant. Florida has twice won the Miss America crown.

In the fall of 2018, the Miss America Organization terminated Miss Florida organization's license as well as licenses from Georgia, New Jersey, New York, Pennsylvania, Tennessee, and West Virginia. In December 2018, the Miss America Organization reinstated licensing for the Miss Florida Scholarship Pageant Inc., along with the organizations in Georgia, Pennsylvania, Tennessee, and West Virginia.

Lindsay Bettis of Ponte Vedra Beach was crowned Miss Florida 2022 on June 25, 2022 at Youkey Theater in Lakeland, Florida. She competed for the title of Miss America 2023 at the Mohegan Sun in Uncasville, Connecticut in December 2022 where she was a finalist for both the Women in Business and Equity & Justice awards along with Non-finalist Social Impact Pitch winner,

Gallery of past titleholders

Results summary 
The following is a visual summary of the past results of Miss Florida titleholders at the national Miss America pageants/competitions. The year in parentheses indicates the year of the national competition during which a placement and/or award was garnered, not the year attached to the contestant's state title.

Placements 
 Miss Americas: Leanza Cornett (1993), Ericka Dunlap (2004)
 1st runners-up: Muriel Elizabeth Smith (1943), Ann Gloria Daniel (1955)
 2nd runners-up: Virginia Warlen (1944), Janet Ruth Crockett (1951), Carolyn Cline (1979), Lissette Gonzalez (1999)
 3rd runners-up: Virginia Freeland (1945), Carol Lynn Blum (1966), Myrrhanda Jones (2014), Victoria Cowen (2015), Taylor Tyson (2019)
 4th runners-up: Irmigard Dietel (1937), Gloria Smyley (1938), Mary Elizabeth Godwin (1952), Dorothy Maria Steiner (1958), Dawn Cashwell (1968), Cathy La Belle (1978), Marti Sue Phillips (1980), Sierra Minott (2009)
 Top 10: Leona Fredericks (1942), Eileen Knapp (1942), Sandra Wirth (1956), Diane Colston (1967), Linda Fitts (1969), Lisa Donovan (1971), Ann K. Schmalzried (1976), Kim Boyce (1984), Jennifer Anne Sauder (1988), Melissa Aggeles (1989), Sandra Joanne Frick (1990), Christy Neuman (1998), Kelly Gaudet (2002), Mari Wilensky (2006), Mary Katherine Fechtel (2016), Leah Roddenberry (2022)
 Top 12: Elizabeth Hull (1935), Vernell Bush (1944)
 Top 13: Kristina Janolo (2012)
 Top 15: Ruth Wooddall (1925), Mary Jane Thomas (1938), Irmigard Dietel (1939), Rose Marie Magrill (1939), Mitzi Strother (1940 and 1941), Pepper Shore (1947), Rosemary Carpenter (1948), Michaela McLean (2020)
 Top 16: Jacquelyn Jennings (1946), Kylie Williams (2008), Laura McKeeman (2013)

Awards

Preliminary awards
 Preliminary Lifestyle and Fitness: Virginia Warlen (1944), Ann Gloria Daniel (1955), Melissa Aggeles (1989), Dana Rinehart Dalton (1991), Lissette Gonzalez (1999), Jenna Edwards (2005), Victoria Cowen (2015), Mary Katherine Fechtel (2016), Sara Zeng (2018)
 Preliminary Talent: Gloria Smyley (1938), Virginia Warlen (1944), Pepper Shore (1947), Sandra Wirth (1956), Dawn Lauree Cashwell (1968), Linda Fitts (1969), Lisa Donovan (1971), Cathy La Belle (1978), Carolyn Cline (1979), Christy Neuman (1998), Myrrhanda Jones (2014), Taylor Tyson (2019)
 Preliminary Evening Gown: Kelly Gaudet (2002)

Non-finalist awards
 Non-finalist Talent: Barbara Jo Ivey (1972), Ellen Meade (1974), Delta Burke (1975), Monica Farrell (1986), Molly Pesce (1987), Mary Ann Olson (1992), Jamie Bolding (1997)
 Non-finalist Interview: Megan Welch (1995), Jamie Bolding (1997)
 Non-finalist Social Impact Pitch: Lindsay Bettis (2023)

Other awards
 Equity and Justice Finalist: Leah Roddenberry (2022), Lindsay Bettis (2023)
 Bernie Wayne Talent Award: Lissette Gonzalez (1999)
 Charles & Theresa Brown Scholarship: Victoria Cowen (2015)
 Dr. David B. Allman Medical Scholarship: Ann K. Schmalzried (1976)
 Final Night Evening Gown Award: Ericka Dunlap (2004)
 Final Night Talent Award: Ericka Dunlap (2004)
Jean Bartel Social Impact Initiative Finalist: Leah Roddenberry (2022)
 Quality of Life Award 1st runners-up: Kylie Williams (2008)
 Quality of Life Award Finalists: Jenna Edwards (2005), Jaclyn Raulerson (2011)
 Women in Business Finalists: Lindsay Bettis (2023)

Winners

Executive director accusations
Mary Sullivan, the longtime executive director of Miss Florida until her resignation in 2018, was arrested in 2022 and accused of stealing around $100,000 from the program from 2011–2018.  The arrest came after an investigation into past financial irregularities by the Board of Directors after her retirement.  She was accused of redirecting non-profit donations intended for use on scholarships to her own account, which she spent on personal matters such as maid service and dating sites.

References

External links
 Miss Florida official website

Florida culture
Florida
Women in Florida
1922 establishments in Florida
Recurring events established in 1922
Annual events in Florida